Blastobasis vesta is a moth in the  family Blastobasidae. It is found in Costa Rica.

The length of the forewings is 5.1–7.4 mm. The forewings have greyish-brown scales tipped with pale greyish brown. The hindwings are translucent pale brown, gradually darkening towards the apex.

Etymology
The specific name refers to Vesta, daughter of Saturn and Ops.

References

Moths described in 2013
Blastobasis
Moths of Central America